Imoro Lukman  (born October 4, 1984) is a Ghanaian football player who played in Israel for Hapoel Petah Tikva football club.

Career
Lukman started his career with Real Sportive and later on he moved to Maccabi Netanya from the Israeli Premier League. He played for Netanya for 2.5 years before he was transferred to Bnei Yehuda. He had a very successful run in Bnei Yehuda and played for the club for over 3 seasons.

In the summer of 2008 he moved to play in the Cypriot First Division as he signed a two years contract with AEP Paphos. In the 2010–11 season he played for APOP Kinyras. At the start of the 2011–12 season he moved to Nea Salamis Famagusta and later on in January 2012 he returned to play in Israel as he signed for Hapoel Rishon LeZion.

In the summer of 2012, Lukman signed a four-year contract with Hapoel Acre but was released from the club in February 2013. He joined Bnei Sakhnin after he was released from Acre. In June 2013 he moved to Hapoel Petah Tikva. The next season, he moved to Hapoel Bnei Lod.

International career 
Lukman played for the Black Satellites in the 2003 African Youth Championship. Later on that year, Lukman won his first and only cap for the senior side.

Honours 
Israel State Cup
Runner-up (1): 2006
Liga Leumit
Runner-up (1): 2013–14

References

External links 
 
 

1984 births
Living people
Ghanaian footballers
Real Sportive players
Maccabi Netanya F.C. players
Bnei Yehuda Tel Aviv F.C. players
AEP Paphos FC players
APOP Kinyras FC players
Nea Salamis Famagusta FC players
Hapoel Rishon LeZion F.C. players
Hapoel Acre F.C. players
Bnei Sakhnin F.C. players
Hapoel Petah Tikva F.C. players
Hapoel Bnei Lod F.C. players
Expatriate footballers in Israel
Ghanaian expatriate sportspeople in Cyprus
Expatriate footballers in Cyprus
Ghanaian expatriate sportspeople in Israel
Israeli Premier League players
Cypriot First Division players
Liga Leumit players
Association football defenders
Ghana international footballers